The 2012 Banja Luka Challenger was a professional tennis tournament played on clay courts. It was the eleventh edition of the tournament which was part of the 2012 ATP Challenger Tour. It took place in Banja Luka, Bosnia and Herzegovina between 10 and 16 September 2012.

Singles main draw entrants

Seeds

 1 Rankings are as of August 27, 2012.

Other entrants
The following players received wildcards into the singles main draw:
  Tomislav Brkić
  Nikola Čačić
  Marko Djokovic
  Bastian Trinker

The following players received entry from the qualifying draw:
  Marcin Gawron
  Carlos Gómez-Herrera
  Steven Moneke
  Artem Smirnov

Champions

Singles

 Victor Hănescu def.  Andreas Haider-Maurer, 6–4, 6–1

Doubles

 Marin Draganja /  Lovro Zovko def.  Colin Ebelthite /  Jaroslav Pospíšil, 6–1, 6–1

External links
Official Website

Banja Luka Challenger
Banja Luka Challenger
2012 in Bosnia and Herzegovina sport